Himalaya kingdom was a mountainous country in Himalayas mentioned in the Puranas. In the puranas, Himavat was its ruler and his daughter Parvati was a princess from this kingdom.  The Indian epic Mahabharata doesn't mention a kingdom named Himalaya, but mentions many kingdoms in the Himalaya mountains like the Kuninda, Parvata, Nepa, Kirata, Kimpurusha, and Kinnara.

References in Mahabharata 
Arjuna was mentioned to have made an expedition to the kingdoms in the mountainous Himalayan regions (2:27).  Having conquered all the Himalayas and the Nishkuta mountains and arriving at the White mountains, he encamped on its breast (2:26).  Pandavas saw with delight the extensive domains of Suvahu, situated on the Himalayas, abounding in horses and elephants, densely inhabited by the Kiratas and the Tanganas, and crowded by hundreds of Pulindas (3:140).  Pandavas were mentioned as mining gold from the gold mines of Himalayas at (14:63,64).

See also 
 Kingdoms of Ancient India
 Nepa Kingdom
 Parvata Kingdom
 Kirata Kingdom

References 
 Mahabharata of Krishna Dwaipayana Vyasa, translated to English by Kisari Mohan Ganguli

External links
 Himalaya Kingdom

Kingdoms in the Puranas